Paliclavine is an ergot alkaloid precursor.

References

Ergolines